Emi Hasegawa (born 8 May 1986) is a Japanese alpine ski racer. She competed at the 2011 World Championships in Garmisch-Partenkirchen, Germany in the slalom and giant slalom. She competed at the 2015 World Championships in Beaver Creek, USA, in the giant slalom.

Career
She made her World Cup debut on 15 December 2008 in Levi, Finland. At the 2011 FIS Alpine World Ski Championships she was disqualified during the first run of the slalom and finished 41st in the giant slalom. At the 2015 FIS Alpine World Ski Championships she finished 28th in the giant slalom.

World Cup results

World Championship results

References

External links
 
 Emi Hasegawa World Cup standings at the International Ski Federation
 

1986 births
Japanese female alpine skiers
Asian Games medalists in alpine skiing
Asian Games gold medalists for Japan
Alpine skiers at the 2017 Asian Winter Games
Medalists at the 2017 Asian Winter Games
Living people
21st-century Japanese women